Viktória Fráter (born August 30, 1977, Budapest) is a retired Hungarian rhythmic gymnast.

She represented Hungary in the rhythmic gymnastics individual all-around competition at three Olympic Games: in 1992 in Barcelona, in 1996 in Atlanta, and in 2000 in Sydney. In 1992 she was 24th in the qualification round and didn't advance to the final, in 1996 she was 23rd in the qualification round and didn't advance to the semifinal, in 2000 she was 20th in the qualification round and didn't advance to the final.

References

External links 
 

1977 births
Living people
Hungarian rhythmic gymnasts
Gymnasts at the 1992 Summer Olympics
Gymnasts at the 1996 Summer Olympics
Gymnasts at the 2000 Summer Olympics
Olympic gymnasts of Hungary
Gymnasts from Budapest